Onthophagus heterorrhinus, is a species of dung beetle found in India, Sri Lanka and Myanmar.

Description
This very small oval, highly convex species has an average length of about 4 mm. Body black in color. Elytra bright orange-yellow, with a black broad irregular median band. Head and pronotum with a coppery or metallic green shine. Antennae and mouthparts are yellowish whereas legs are reddish. Dorsum and ventrum both covered with long yellowish hairs. Head narrow, shiny, with large scanty punctures. Clypeus separated by a curved carina from the forehead. Pronotum very convex, strongly and closely punctured. Elytra very finely striate, with flat intervals and fine double series punctures. Pygidium evenly and fairly strongly punctured. Male has bluntly bilobed clypeus withs straight sides. There is a pair of minute tubercles between the eyes on vertex. Female has gently rounded clypeus which is truncate in front. Vertex with a short straight carina between the eyes.

References 

Scarabaeinae
Insects of India
Beetles of Sri Lanka
Insects described in 1885